The Borough of Kettering was from 1974 to 2021 a local government district and borough in Northamptonshire, England. It was named after its main town Kettering where the council was based. It bordered onto the district of Harborough in the neighbouring county of Leicestershire, the borough of Corby, the district of East Northamptonshire, the district of Daventry and the borough of Wellingborough.

Abolition and replacement
In March 2018, following suspension of the County Council arising from its becoming insolvent, due to financial and cultural mismanagement by the cabinet and officers, the then Secretary of State for Local Government, Sajid Javid, sent commissioner Max Caller into the council, who recommended the county council and all district and borough councils in the county be abolished, and replaced by two unitary authorities, one covering the West, and one the North of the county. These proposals were approved in April 2019. It meant that the districts of Daventry, Northampton and South Northamptonshire were merged to form a new unitary authority called West Northamptonshire, whilst the second unitary authority North Northamptonshire consists of Corby, East Northamptonshire, Kettering and Wellingborough districts. These new authorities came into being on 1 April 2021. Elections for the new authorities were due to be held on 7 May 2020, but were delayed due to the COVID-19 pandemic.

Settlements and parishes
Other than Kettering itself, the borough included:

Ashley
Barton Seagrave, Brampton Ash, Braybrooke, Broughton, Burton Latimer
Cranford, Cransley
Desborough, Dingley
Geddington, Grafton Underwood
Harrington
Loddington
Mawsley Village
Newton and Little Oakley
Orton
Pytchley
Rothwell, Rushton
Stoke Albany, Sutton Bassett
Thorpe Malsor
Warkton, Weekley, Weston by Welland, Wilbarston

Political control
It composed of 36 local councillors and most recently controlled by the Conservatives, who controlled the Council since the 2003 local elections, where they gained control from Labour with a majority of 15.

History

 2003-Present: Conservative controlled
 2001-2003-: Labour controlled (due to a by-election gain in St. Michael's Ward)
 1999-2001: No Overall Control (Labour minority administration)
 1995-1999: Labour controlled
 1987-1995: No Overall Control
 1983-1987: Conservative controlled
 1973-1983: No Overall Control

Arms

See also

 Grade I listed buildings in Kettering (borough)
 Grade II* listed buildings in Kettering (borough)

References

 
Former non-metropolitan districts
Non-metropolitan districts of Northamptonshire
Former boroughs in England
2021 disestablishments in England
North Northamptonshire